Silviya Topalova (born 7 March 1964) is a Bulgarian gymnast. She competed in six events at the 1980 Summer Olympics.

References

1964 births
Living people
Bulgarian female artistic gymnasts
Olympic gymnasts of Bulgaria
Gymnasts at the 1980 Summer Olympics
Place of birth missing (living people)